The Nocturne in B major, Op. 40 (B. 47), is a single-movement composition for string orchestra by Antonín Dvořák, published in 1883.

History
The work originated as the slow movement, Andante religioso, of Dvořák's early string quartet, No. 4 in E minor, of 1870, which was unpublished in his lifetime. The movement was adapted and included in his String Quintet No. 2 in G, of 1875: it was one of two slow movements, and he later withdrew this movement from the quintet.
 
He developed it into this nocturne; the work was published in 1883 by Simrock. As well as the version for string orchestra (B. 47), he made versions for violin and piano (B. 48a) and piano four hands (B. 48b).

Structure
The work is in the key of B major, and its duration is about 9 minutes. There is a calm atmosphere throughout. After a simple introduction in octaves, there is a long section, featuring a winding melody over a pedal note of F which gives a sense of anticipation; eventually this gives way to a more animated section. Finally there is a return, without the sense of anticipation, to the original texture.

References 

Compositions by Antonín Dvořák
Compositions for string orchestra
Dvorak
1883 compositions
Compositions in B major
Compositions for violin and piano